Ocheretyne is an urban-type settlement in Pokrovsk Raion of Donetsk Oblast in Ukraine.

History
Ocheretyne was founded in 1880 in connection with the construction of a railway and a station.

169 villagers fought against Nazi soldiers on the fronts of World War II, of whom 78 died on the battlefield, and 121 were awarded orders and medals. Two monuments have been erected on the graves of soldiers who died during the liberation of the village from the Nazi occupiers. A memorial plaque has been erected in honor of fellow villagers who gave their lives for the liberation of the motherland from the Nazis.

On 9 December 2014, following the events surrounding the War in Donbass, the Verkhovna Rada, Ukraine's national parliament, moved Yasynuvata Raion's administration buildings and government to вул. Першотравнева 12, (English: 12 May Day Street) in Ocheretyne, which is near  about 35 km north-northwest of Donetsk. As a result, Ocheretyne was the de facto administrative center of the raion until it was abolished on 18 July 2020 as part of the administrative reform of Ukraine, which reduced the number of raions of Donetsk Oblast to eight, of which only five were controlled by the government.

Demographics
Native language as of the Ukrainian Census of 2001:
 Ukrainian 44.67%
 Russian 54.52%
 Armenian 0.25%
 Romani 0.22%
 German 0.07%
 Belarusian 0.05%
 Polish  and Romanian 0.02%

References

Urban-type settlements in Pokrovsk Raion